Citharexylum is a genus of flowering plants in the verbena family, Verbenaceae.  It contains shrub and tree species commonly known as fiddlewoods or zitherwoods. They are native to the Americas, ranging from southern Florida and Texas in the United States to Argentina. The highest diversity occurs in Mexico and the Andes. The generic name is derived from the Greek words κιθάρα (kithara), meaning "lyre", and ξύλον (xylon), meaning "wood," referring to the use of the wood in the sounding boards of string instruments. Several species, especially C. caudatum and C. spinosum, are cultivated as ornamentals.

Species
 Citharexylum affine D.Don - from northern Mexico to Nicaragua
 Citharexylum alainii Moldenke - Dominican Republic
 Citharexylum albicaule Turcz. - Cuba
 Citharexylum altamiranum Greenm. - northeastern Mexico
 Citharexylum andinum Moldenke - Bolivia, Jujuy Province of Argentina
 Citharexylum argutedentatum Moldenke - Peru
 Citharexylum berlandieri B.L. Rob. -  from Texas to Oaxaca - Berlandier's fiddlewood, Tamaulipan fiddlewood
 Citharexylum bourgeauanum Greenm. - Veracruz, Oaxaca
 Citharexylum brachyanthum (A.Gray ex Hemsl.) A.Gray - Texas, Coahuila, Nuevo León - Boxthorn fiddlewood, Mexican fiddlewood
 Citharexylum bullatum Moldenke - Colombia
 Citharexylum calvum Moldenke - Quintana Roo
 Citharexylum caudatum L. - southern Mexico, West Indies, Central America, Colombia, Peru -  Juniper berry
 Citharexylum chartaceum Moldenke - Peru, Ecuador
 Citharexylum cooperi Standl. - Costa Rica, Panama, Guatemala
 Citharexylum costaricense Moldenke - Costa Rica, Nicaragua, Honduras
 Citharexylum crassifolium Greenm - Chiapas, Belize, Guatemala, Honduras
 Citharexylum danirae León de la Luz & F.Chiang - Revillagigedo Islands of Baja California
 Citharexylum decorum Moldenke - Colombia, Venezuela
 Citharexylum dentatum D.Don - Peru
 Citharexylum discolor Turcz. - Cuba, Hispaniola
 Citharexylum donnell-smithii Greenm. - Oaxaca, Chiapas, Central America
 Citharexylum dryanderae Moldenke - Colombia, Venezuela, Peru, Ecuador
 Citharexylum ekmanii Moldenke - Cuba
 Citharexylum ellipticum Moc. & Sessé ex D.Don - Veracruz, Campeche, Tabasco; naturalized in Cuba + Cayman Islands
 Citharexylum endlichii Moldenke - northeastern Mexico
 Citharexylum flabellifolium S.Watson - Sonora, Baja California
 Citharexylum flexuosum (Ruiz & Pav.) D.Don - Bolivia, Peru
 Citharexylum fulgidum Moldenke - Veracruz, northeastern Mexico
 Citharexylum gentryi Moldenke - Ecuador
 Citharexylum glabrum (S.Watson) Greenm - Oaxaca
 Citharexylum glaziovii Moldenke - eastern Brazil
 Citharexylum grandiflorum Aymard & Rueda - Ecuador
 Citharexylum guatemalense (Moldenke) D.N.Gibson - Guatemala, Nicaragua
 Citharexylum herrerae Mansf. - Peru
 Citharexylum hexangulare Greenm. - from northern Mexico to Costa Rica
 Citharexylum hidalgense Moldenke - Mexico
 Citharexylum hintonii Moldenke - México State
 Citharexylum hirtellum Standl. - from Veracruz to Panama
 Citharexylum ilicifolium Kunth  - Bolivia, Peru, Ecuador
 Citharexylum iltisii Moldenke - Peru
 Citharexylum × jamaicense Moldenke - Jamaica, Haiti, Puerto Rico   (C. caudatum × C. spinosum)
 Citharexylum joergensenii (Lillo) Moldenke - Argentina, Bolivia
 Citharexylum karstenii Moldenke - Colombia, Venezuela
 Citharexylum kerberi Greenm. - Veracruz
 Citharexylum kobuskianum Moldenke - Peru
 Citharexylum krukovii Moldenke - eastern Brazil
 Citharexylum kunthianum Moldenke - Colombia, Venezuela, Ecuador
 Citharexylum laetum Hiern - southern Brazil
 Citharexylum laurifolium Hayek - Bolivia, Peru
 Citharexylum lemsii Moldenke - Guanacaste Province in Costa Rica
 Citharexylum × leonis Moldenke - Cuba   (C. caudatum × C. tristachyum)
 Citharexylum ligustrifolium (Thur. ex Decne.) Van Houtte - Mexico
 Citharexylum lojense Moldenke - Ecuador
 Citharexylum lucidum Cham. & Schltdl. - Mexico
 Citharexylum lycioides D.Don - Mexico
 Citharexylum macradenium Greenm. - Panama, Costa Rica
 Citharexylum macrochlamys Pittier - Panama, Colombia
 Citharexylum macrophyllum Poir. - Colombia, Venezuela, Ecuador, Guianas, northwestern Brazil
 Citharexylum matheanum Borhidi & Kereszty - Cuba
 Citharexylum matudae Moldenke - Chiapas
 Citharexylum mexicanum Moldenke - Veracruz, Puebla, Oaxaca
 Citharexylum microphyllum (DC.) O.E.Schulz  - Hisipaniola
 Citharexylum mirifolium Moldenke - Colombia, Venezuela
 Citharexylum mocinoi D.Don - Mexico, Central America
 Citharexylum montanum Moldenke - Colombia, Ecuador
 Citharexylum montevidense (Spreng.)  Moldenke - Brazil, Argentina, Paraguay, Uruguay
 Citharexylum myrianthum Cham. - Brazil, Argentina, Paraguay
 Citharexylum obtusifolium Kuhlm - Espírito Santo
 Citharexylum oleinum (Benth. ex Lindl.) Moldenke - Mexico
 Citharexylum ovatifolium Greenm. - Mexico
 Citharexylum pachyphyllum Moldenke - Peru
 Citharexylum pernambucense Moldenke - eastern Brazil
 Citharexylum poeppigii Walp. - Colombia, Venezuela, Ecuador, Bolivia, Peru, Brazil
 Citharexylum punctatum Greenm. - Bolivia, Peru
 Citharexylum quercifolium Hayek - Peru
 Citharexylum quitense Spreng. - Ecuador
 Citharexylum racemosum Sessé & Moc. - Mexico
 Citharexylum reticulatum Kunth - Ecuador, Peru
 Citharexylum rigidum (Briq.) Moldenke - Paraguay, southern Brazil
 Citharexylum rimbachii Moldenke - Ecuador
 Citharexylum rosei Greenm. - Mexico
 Citharexylum roxanae Moldenke - Baja California
 Citharexylum scabrum Moc. & Sessé ex D.Don - northern Mexico
 Citharexylum schottii Greenm. - southern Mexico, Central America
 Citharexylum schulzii Urb. & Ekman - Hispaniola
 Citharexylum sessaei D.Don - Mexico
 Citharexylum shrevei Moldenke - Sonora
 Citharexylum solanaceum Cham. - southern Brazil
 Citharexylum spinosum L. – Spiny fiddlewood - West Indies, Panama, Venezuela, the Guianas; naturalized in India, Mozambique, Fiji, Bermuda
 Citharexylum stenophyllum Urb. & Ekman - Haiti
 Citharexylum steyermarkii Moldenke - Veracruz, Chiapas, Guatemala
 Citharexylum suberosum Loes. ex Moldenke - Cuba
 Citharexylum subflavescens S.F.Blake - Colombia, Venezuela, Ecuador, Peru
 Citharexylum subthyrsoideum Pittier - Colombia, Venezuela
 Citharexylum subtruncatum Moldenke - northwestern Brazil
 Citharexylum sulcatum Moldenke - Colombia
 Citharexylum svensonii Moldenke - Ecuador
 Citharexylum teclense Standl. - El Salvador
 Citharexylum ternatum Moldenke - Cuba
 Citharexylum tetramerum Brandegee - Valle de Tehuacán-Cuicatlán in Mexico
 Citharexylum tristachyum Turcz. – Threespike Fiddlewood - Cuba, Jamaica, Leeward Islands
 Citharexylum ulei Moldenke - Colombia, Peru, northwestern Brazil
 Citharexylum vallense Moldenke - Colombia
 Citharexylum venezuelense Moldenke - Venezuela
 Citharexylum weberbaueri Hayek - Peru

Formerly placed here

Rhaphithamnus spinosus (Juss.) Moldenke (as. C. cyanocarpum Hook. & Arn.)
 Citharexylum elegans Phil. ex Miers, a synonym for Rhaphithamnus venustus

References

External links

 
Verbenaceae genera